The 2001–02 New York Rangers season was the franchise's 76th season. During the regular season, the Rangers finished fourth in the Atlantic Division, compiling a 36–38–4–4 record. Their 11th-place finish in the Eastern Conference kept them out of the Stanley Cup playoffs for the fifth straight season. Head coach Ron Low was fired after the season.

Pre-season
On September 20, 2001, in the middle of a 2–2 game between the Philadelphia Flyers and New York Rangers, the game was stopped. A message from United States President George W. Bush about the September 11 attacks was broadcast on the arena video screen. After the message, the game did not resume and it was declared a 2–2 tie.

Regular season
The Rangers struggled in short-handed situations, finishing the regular season with the most power-play opportunities against (398), the most power-play goals allowed (80) and the lowest penalty-kill percentage (79.90%).

Final standings

Schedule and results

|- align="center" bgcolor="#FFBBBB"
| 1 || October 5, 2001 || @ Carolina Hurricanes || 3–1 || 0–1–0–0 || 
|- align="center" bgcolor="#CCFFCC"
| 2 || October 7, 2001 || Buffalo Sabres || 5–4 OT || 1–1–0–0 || 
|- align="center" bgcolor="#FFBBBB"
| 3 || October 10, 2001 || Washington Capitals || 5–2 || 1–2–0–0 || 
|- align="center" bgcolor="white"
| 4 || October 13, 2001 || @ Ottawa Senators || 2–2 OT || 1–2–1–0 || 
|- align="center" bgcolor="#CCFFCC"
| 5 || October 15, 2001 || @ Montreal Canadiens || 2–1 || 2–2–1–0 || 
|- align="center" bgcolor="#CCFFCC"
| 6 || October 17, 2001 || New Jersey Devils || 4–3 OT || 3–2–1–0 || 
|- align="center" bgcolor="#CCFFCC"
| 7 || October 19, 2001 || @ Atlanta Thrashers || 4–3 || 4–2–1–0 || 
|- align="center" bgcolor="#FFBBBB"
| 8 || October 20, 2001 || @ Tampa Bay Lightning || 5–2 || 4–3–1–0 || 
|- align="center" bgcolor="#FFBBBB"
| 9 || October 22, 2001 || San Jose Sharks || 5–1 || 4–4–1–0 || 
|- align="center" bgcolor="#FFBBBB"
| 10 || October 25, 2001 || @ St. Louis Blues || 5–1 || 4–5–1–0 || 
|- align="center" bgcolor="#CCFFCC"
| 11 || October 27, 2001 || @ Boston Bruins || 2–1 OT || 5–5–1–0 || 
|- align="center" bgcolor="#CCFFCC"
| 12 || October 29, 2001 || Dallas Stars || 4–2 || 6–5–1–0 || 
|- align="center" bgcolor="#FFBBBB"
| 13 || October 31, 2001 || Florida Panthers || 3–1 || 6–6–1–0 || 
|-

|- align="center" bgcolor="#FFBBBB"
| 14 || November 2, 2001 || @ Carolina Hurricanes || 3–2 || 6–7–1–0 || 
|- align="center" bgcolor="#CCFFCC"
| 15 || November 3, 2001 || @ Florida Panthers || 5–3 || 7–7–1–0 || 
|- align="center" bgcolor="#CCFFCC"
| 16 || November 6, 2001 || Minnesota Wild || 3–1 || 8–7–1–0 || 
|- align="center" bgcolor="#CCFFCC"
| 17 || November 8, 2001 || @ New York Islanders || 6–2 || 9–7–1–0 || 
|- align="center" bgcolor="#CCFFCC"
| 18 || November 10, 2001 || @ Buffalo Sabres || 4–2 || 10–7–1–0 || 
|- align="center" bgcolor="#CCFFCC"
| 19 || November 11, 2001 || Montreal Canadiens || 3–2 OT || 11–7–1–0 || 
|- align="center" bgcolor="#CCFFCC"
| 20 || November 14, 2001 || Philadelphia Flyers || 4–2 || 12–7–1–0 || 
|- align="center" bgcolor="#FF6F6F"
| 21 || November 17, 2001 || @ Pittsburgh Penguins || 1–0 OT || 12–7–1–1 || 
|- align="center" bgcolor="#CCFFCC"
| 22 || November 18, 2001 || Atlanta Thrashers || 6–2 || 13–7–1–1 || 
|- align="center" bgcolor="#CCFFCC"
| 23 || November 20, 2001 || Colorado Avalanche || 5–3 || 14–7–1–1 || 
|- align="center" bgcolor="#FFBBBB"
| 24 || November 23, 2001 || @ Washington Capitals || 6–2 || 14–8–1–1 || 
|- align="center" bgcolor="#FFBBBB"
| 25 || November 25, 2001 || Mighty Ducks of Anaheim || 3–2 || 14–9–1–1 || 
|- align="center" bgcolor="white"
| 26 || November 27, 2001 || @ Buffalo Sabres || 2–2 OT || 14–9–2–1 || 
|- align="center" bgcolor="#CCFFCC"
| 27 || November 29, 2001 || Carolina Hurricanes || 5–0 || 15–9–2–1 || 
|-

|- align="center" bgcolor="#CCFFCC"
| 28 || December 1, 2001 || @ Montreal Canadiens || 3–1 || 16–9–2–1 || 
|- align="center" bgcolor="#CCFFCC"
| 29 || December 2, 2001 || Tampa Bay Lightning || 1–0 || 17–9–2–1 || 
|- align="center" bgcolor="#FFBBBB"
| 30 || December 4, 2001 || @ Washington Capitals || 5–2 || 17–10–2–1 || 
|- align="center" bgcolor="#FFBBBB"
| 31 || December 6, 2001 || Toronto Maple Leafs || 6–3 || 17–11–2–1 || 
|- align="center" bgcolor="#FFBBBB"
| 32 || December 8, 2001 || @ Toronto Maple Leafs || 4–3 || 17–12–2–1 || 
|- align="center" bgcolor="#FF6F6F"
| 33 || December 10, 2001 || Carolina Hurricanes || 4–3 OT || 17–12–2–2 || 
|- align="center" bgcolor="#FFBBBB"
| 34 || December 12, 2001 || Nashville Predators || 4–2 || 17–13–2–2 || 
|- align="center" bgcolor="#CCFFCC"
| 35 || December 15, 2001 || Buffalo Sabres || 4–2 || 18–13–2–2 || 
|- align="center" bgcolor="#CCFFCC"
| 36 || December 17, 2001 || Florida Panthers || 4–2 || 19–13–2–2 || 
|- align="center" bgcolor="white"
| 37 || December 19, 2001 || New Jersey Devils || 2–2 OT || 19–13–3–2 || 
|- align="center" bgcolor="#FFBBBB"
| 38 || December 21, 2001 || New York Islanders || 2–1 || 19–14–3–2 || 
|- align="center" bgcolor="#CCFFCC"
| 39 || December 23, 2001 || Ottawa Senators || 3–2 || 20–14–3–2 || 
|- align="center" bgcolor="#CCFFCC"
| 40 || December 28, 2001 || @ San Jose Sharks || 5–3 || 21–14–3–2 || 
|- align="center" bgcolor="#CCFFCC"
| 41 || December 29, 2001 || @ Los Angeles Kings || 5–4 || 22–14–3–2 || 
|- align="center" bgcolor="#FFBBBB"
| 42 || December 31, 2001 || @ Phoenix Coyotes || 5–0 || 22–15–3–2 || 
|-

|- align="center" bgcolor="#FFBBBB"
| 43 || January 2, 2002 || @ Edmonton Oilers || 4–1 || 22–16–3–2 || 
|- align="center" bgcolor="#FF6F6F"
| 44 || January 3, 2002 || @ Colorado Avalanche || 3–2 OT || 22–16–3–3 || 
|- align="center" bgcolor="#FFBBBB"
| 45 || January 5, 2002 || @ Pittsburgh Penguins || 4–1 || 22–17–3–3 || 
|- align="center" bgcolor="#FFBBBB"
| 46 || January 9, 2002 || Los Angeles Kings || 4–0 || 22–18–3–3 || 
|- align="center" bgcolor="#FFBBBB"
| 47 || January 12, 2002 || @ Philadelphia Flyers || 4–2 || 22–19–3–3 || 
|- align="center" bgcolor="white"
| 48 || January 14, 2002 || Columbus Blue Jackets || 2–2 OT || 22–19–4–3 || 
|- align="center" bgcolor="#FFBBBB"
| 49 || January 16, 2002 || @ Columbus Blue Jackets || 2–0 || 22–20–4–3 || 
|- align="center" bgcolor="#FFBBBB"
| 50 || January 17, 2002 || @ New Jersey Devils || 6–4 || 22–21–4–3 || 
|- align="center" bgcolor="#CCFFCC"
| 51 || January 22, 2002 || @ New York Islanders || 5–4 || 23–21–4–3 || 
|- align="center" bgcolor="#CCFFCC"
| 52 || January 23, 2002 || Boston Bruins || 8–4 || 24–21–4–3 || 
|- align="center" bgcolor="#CCFFCC"
| 53 || January 26, 2002 || Washington Capitals || 6–3 || 25–21–4–3 || 
|- align="center" bgcolor="#FFBBBB"
| 54 || January 28, 2002 || Tampa Bay Lightning || 1–0 || 25–22–4–3 || 
|- align="center" bgcolor="#FFBBBB"
| 55 || January 30, 2002 || New York Islanders || 6–3 || 25–23–4–3 || 
|-

|- align="center" bgcolor="#FFBBBB"
| 56 || February 6, 2002 || @ Detroit Red Wings || 3–1 || 25–24–4–3 || 
|- align="center" bgcolor="#CCFFCC"
| 57 || February 8, 2002 || @ Atlanta Thrashers || 2–1 || 26–24–4–3 || 
|- align="center" bgcolor="#CCFFCC"
| 58 || February 10, 2002 || Pittsburgh Penguins || 4–3 || 27–24–4–3 || 
|- align="center" bgcolor="#FFBBBB"
| 59 || February 13, 2002 || @ Dallas Stars || 4–2 || 27–25–4–3 || 
|- align="center" bgcolor="#FFBBBB"
| 60 || February 26, 2002 || New Jersey Devils || 4–3 || 27–26–4–3 || 
|- align="center" bgcolor="#FFBBBB"
| 61 || February 28, 2002 || Ottawa Senators || 3–0 || 27–27–4–3 || 
|-

|- align="center" bgcolor="#CCFFCC"
| 62 || March 2, 2002 || Philadelphia Flyers || 6–5 || 28–27–4–3 || 
|- align="center" bgcolor="#FFBBBB"
| 63 || March 4, 2002 || Calgary Flames || 5–3 || 28–28–4–3 || 
|- align="center" bgcolor="#CCFFCC"
| 64 || March 5, 2002 || @ Minnesota Wild || 3–2 OT || 29–28–4–3 || 
|- align="center" bgcolor="#FFBBBB"
| 65 || March 7, 2002 || @ Chicago Blackhawks || 5–1 || 29–29–4–3 || 
|- align="center" bgcolor="#FF6F6F"
| 66 || March 9, 2002 || @ Pittsburgh Penguins || 3–2 OT || 29–29–4–4 || 
|- align="center" bgcolor="#CCFFCC"
| 67 || March 11, 2002 || Montreal Canadiens || 2–1 || 30–29–4–4 || 
|- align="center" bgcolor="#FFBBBB"
| 68 || March 13, 2002 || Boston Bruins || 3–1 || 30–30–4–4 || 
|- align="center" bgcolor="#FFBBBB"
| 69 || March 16, 2002 || @ New Jersey Devils || 3–1 || 30–31–4–4 || 
|- align="center" bgcolor="#FFBBBB"
| 70 || March 17, 2002 || Detroit Red Wings || 5–3 || 30–32–4–4 || 
|- align="center" bgcolor="#FFBBBB"
| 71 || March 19, 2002 || Vancouver Canucks || 3–1 || 30–33–4–4 || 
|- align="center" bgcolor="#CCFFCC"
| 72 || March 21, 2002 || @ Ottawa Senators || 5–2 || 31–33–4–4 || 
|- align="center" bgcolor="#FFBBBB"
| 73 || March 22, 2002 || Atlanta Thrashers || 5–2 || 31–34–4–4 || 
|- align="center" bgcolor="#FFBBBB"
| 74 || March 25, 2002 || @ New York Islanders || 4–2 || 31–35–4–4 || 
|- align="center" bgcolor="#FFBBBB"
| 75 || March 27, 2002 || Philadelphia Flyers || 4–2 || 31–36–4–4 || 
|- align="center" bgcolor="#CCFFCC"
| 76 || March 30, 2002 || @ Florida Panthers || 4–2 || 32–36–4–4 || 
|-

|- align="center" bgcolor="#CCFFCC"
| 77 || April 1, 2002 || @ Tampa Bay Lightning || 6–4 || 33–36–4–4 || 
|- align="center" bgcolor="#CCFFCC"
| 78 || April 4, 2002 || @ Toronto Maple Leafs || 4–2 || 34–36–4–4 || 
|- align="center" bgcolor="#CCFFCC"
| 79 || April 6, 2002 || @ Boston Bruins || 6–4 || 35–36–4–4 || 
|- align="center" bgcolor="#CCFFCC"
| 80 || April 8, 2002 || Pittsburgh Penguins || 3–2 || 36–36–4–4 || 
|- align="center" bgcolor="#FFBBBB"
| 81 || April 10, 2002 || Toronto Maple Leafs || 7–2 || 36–37–4–4 || 
|- align="center" bgcolor="#FFBBBB"
| 82 || April 13, 2002 || @ Philadelphia Flyers || 2–1 || 36–38–4–4 || 
|-

|-
| Legend:

Player statistics

Scoring
 Position abbreviations: C = Center; D = Defense; G = Goaltender; LW = Left Wing; RW = Right Wing
  = Joined team via a transaction (e.g., trade, waivers, signing) during the season. Stats reflect time with the Rangers only.
  = Left team via a transaction (e.g., trade, waivers, release) during the season. Stats reflect time with the Rangers only.

Goaltending

Transactions
The Rangers were involved in the following transactions from June 10, 2001, the day after the deciding game of the 2001 Stanley Cup Finals, through June 13, 2002, the day of the deciding game of the 2002 Stanley Cup Finals.

Trades

Players acquired

Players lost

Signings

Draft picks
New York's picks at the 2001 NHL Entry Draft in Sunrise, Florida at the National Car Rental Center.

See also
2001–02 NHL season

Notes

References

New York Rangers seasons
New York Rangers
New York Rangers
New York Rangers
New York Rangers
 in Manhattan
Madison Square Garden